Highly skilled applicants can apply for residency in Hong Kong.  Tests that award points to skilled applicants and for economic contributions by investors were recently introduced by the Immigration Department of Hong Kong.

Immigration categories
There are two main immigration categories in effect as of March 2016.

Skilled immigrants
This is a quota-based program that seeks to attract highly skilled persons to settle in Hong Kong. An applicant does not need to obtain a job offer in advance before entering into Hong Kong on a "skilled immigrants" transfer. Two sets of points system are used to evaluate applicants. These are the Achievement Based Points Test and the General Points Test.

Family class
Permanent residents can sponsor family members to immigrate to Hong Kong. The family member sponsored by the Permanent Resident must be either "their spouse, or an unmarried dependent child under the age of 18,  or a parent aged 60 years or above".

Suspended categories

Capital investment 
Under this category, investors from outside had to have net assets of no less than HK$10 million (US$1,300,000) to which they are entitled throughout the 2 years before submitting their application. (This amount was increased from HK$6.5M on 14 October 2010, and is to be reviewed every three years.) The Capital Investment Entrant Scheme was suspended on 15 January 2015

Opposition
Pro-democracy politician Gary Fan has been frequently calling for the government to take back the approval rights on One-way Permits from Chinese authorities and to reduce the quota of such permits. Fan also refers to immigrants from mainland China and the quota of 150 daily permits as "the root of the housing problem".

In January 2013, Gary Fan and Claudia Mo formed a group called "HK First". They co-sponsored a controversial ad which claimed that reducing immigration would help the people of Hong Kong to get to the bottom of the housing problem, while rejecting claims of bias or discrimination against mainlanders, despite condemnation from the Equal Opportunities Commission. Fan later introduced a motion on adhering to the need to "put Hong Kong people first" in formulating policies, but the motion was ultimately defeated.

Many political parties in Hong Kong are opposed to large-scale Chinese immigration citing its impact on freedom and locals resources, especially in primary schools, public housing and certain jobs. These parties include most of pro-democracy parties such as Neo Democrats, Hong Kong Indigenous and Youngspiration. Many pro-democracy parties have stated that they don't oppose legal migration from mainland China but have urged to take back control of One-way permit.

A 2012 poll found more than half (51%) of Hong Kongers thought the number of mainland immigrants allowed into Hong Kong should decrease. Only 16% thought immigration should increase.

See also
 Immigration Department (Hong Kong)
Quality Migrant Admission Scheme
One-way Permit
Demographics of Hong Kong

Notes

References
 Immigration Department of Hong Kong

 
Law of Hong Kong
Politics of Hong Kong
Demographics of Hong Kong